Poppy

Huggy Boy
Huggy Face
Huggy Leaver
Huggy Ragnarsson
Huggy (Pillow Pal)
Huggy Wuggy, an antagonist in the horror video game Poppy Playtime

See also
Huggy Bear (disambiguation)